Viktor Rogan (born 12 December 2002) is a Serbian football right back who plays for Čukarički.

References

External links
 
 

2002 births
Living people
Association football defenders
Serbian footballers
Serbian SuperLiga players
FK Čukarički players
People from Belgrade
Serbia under-21 international footballers